The Rotorcraft XR-11, known by the company as the X-2 Dragonfly, was an American two-seat lightweight helicopter built in the 1940s for evaluation by the United States Air Force by the Rotorcraft Corporation of Glendale, California.

Design and development
The XR-11 was a powered by a  Continental A100 piston engine driving two three-bladed contra-rotating rotors. Only one was built and first flown in 1947, it was re-designated the XH-11 in 1948, the project was later cancelled.

Variants
XR-11
United States Air Force designation later changed to XH-11, one built.

Operators

United States Air Force

Specifications

See also

References

Notes

Bibliography

 

1940s United States military utility aircraft
1940s United States helicopters
Aircraft first flown in 1947
Single-engined piston helicopters
Tandem rotor helicopters